Dominik Schmitt (born 7 April 1992) is a German professional footballer who plays as a midfielder.

References

External links
 
 
 SpVgg Bayreuth II statistics at BFV.de

1992 births
Living people
Sportspeople from Bamberg
Footballers from Bavaria
German footballers
Association football midfielders
Regionalliga players
V.League 1 players
SpVgg Greuther Fürth II players
FC Ingolstadt 04 II players
SpVgg Bayreuth players
Türkgücü München players
SHB Da Nang FC players
German expatriate footballers
German expatriate sportspeople in Vietnam
Expatriate footballers in Vietnam